Kaj Gøtzsche Pindal (December 1, 1927 – June 28, 2019) was an animator and animation educator who worked at the National Film Board of Canada (NFB) beginning in 1957, and created such works as the Academy Award-nominated What on Earth! (1967, co-directed with Les Drew) and the 1988 NFB short Peep and the Big Wide World as well as the television series of the same name in 2004.

Biography
Kaj Pindal began his career as an underground cartoonist during the German occupation of Denmark, and was forced to flee his home city of Copenhagen when his series of anti-Hitler cartoons put his life in peril. After the Second World War, he made animated commercials in Sweden and at Denmark's Nordisk Film, and worked on UNESCO films and filmstrips. He immigrated to Canada in 1957 and joined the NFB the same year.

His NFB credits also include The City: Osaka, created for Expo '70 in Osaka, and designed to give Japanese people a glimpse into Canadian life. This two-minute black-and-white film played during the world's fair on a screen composed of sixty thousand individual light bulbs. Pindal is the subject of a 1979 NFB documentary entitled Laugh Lines.
 
In addition to his work at the NFB, Pindal returned to Denmark for a year in 1970 and spent several months in 1983 teaching in Denmark and Sweden. He remained an influence in Canadian animation through his involvement with Sheridan College, where he had taught from 1977 to 2019. He often stated, "Life is too short for long films."

In 2004, he created Peep and the Big Wide World, which won a Daytime Emmy for Outstanding Children's Animation Program in 2005.

Pindal died on June 28, 2019, at the age of 91.

References

External links
Kaj Pindal's blog
Lambiek Comiclopedia article.
Sheridan Animation Faculty biography

Watch films by Kaj Pindal, National Film Board of Canada website

1927 births
2019 deaths
Danish animators
Danish animated film directors
Danish comics artists
Danish cartoonists
Danish resistance members
People from Copenhagen
Danish emigrants to Canada
National Film Board of Canada people
Academic staff of Sheridan College
Animation educators
Canadian cartoonists
Canadian comics artists
Canadian animated film directors
Canadian people of Danish descent